Organyà is a municipality in the comarca of the Alt Urgell in Catalonia. It is situated on the right bank of the Segre river below the Trespons gorge, and is served by the C-14 road between Ponts and La Seu d'Urgell. There is a monument to the Homilies d'Organyà, a 12th or 13th century collection of sermons which is the oldest literary text in the Catalan language to survive in its entirety, discovered in the town in 1904.

Organyà is the birthplace of Rosa Florentina Eroles (1815-1864), the mother of Francis Ysidro Edgeworth. 

The municipality surrounds an exclave of Cabó.

Demography

References

 Panareda Clopés, Josep Maria; Rios Calvet, Jaume; Rabella Vives, Josep Maria (1989). Guia de Catalunya, Barcelona: Caixa de Catalunya.  (Spanish).  (Catalan).

External links
Official website 
 Government data pages 
Information - Consell comarcal 

Municipalities in Alt Urgell
Populated places in Alt Urgell